John Vecchiarelli (born 4 July 1964) is an Italian ice hockey player. He competed in the men's tournament at the 1992 Winter Olympics.

References

1964 births
Living people
Olympic ice hockey players of Italy
Ice hockey players at the 1992 Winter Olympics
Ice hockey people from Toronto
Peterborough Petes (ice hockey) players
Dallas Freeze players
Las Vegas Thunder players
Brantford Smoke players
Canadian people of Italian descent